The 2022 Major League Soccer All-Star Game was the 26th annual Major League Soccer All-Star Game, an exhibition soccer match in the United States. The game, featuring all-star teams from Major League Soccer (MLS) and Liga MX, took place on August 10, 2022, at Allianz Field in Saint Paul, Minnesota. It was the second MLS All-Star Game to be played under the inter-league format. The all-star game also included a skills challenge, concerts, and other events in the days before the match.

The MLS All-Stars won 2–1 with goals from Carlos Vela in the third minute and Raúl Ruidíaz in the 73rd minute; Liga MX earned a consolation goal in the 84th minute through a strike from Kevin Álvarez. Goalkeeper Dayne St. Clair, who made four saves, was named the match's most valuable player.

Venue

Allianz Field in Saint Paul, Minnesota, home to Minnesota United FC, was announced as the host venue for the All-Star Game in October 2021. The 19,600-seat soccer-specific stadium opened in 2019 and has hosted a FIFA World Cup qualifying match, several international friendlies and CONCACAF Gold Cup matches in addition to club games.

Squads

MLS All-Stars

The MLS All-Stars roster was announced on July 12, 2022. Forward Brandon Vazquez was added to the roster on August 3, 2022, to replace Valentín Castellanos, due to Castellanos' loan move to Girona. Jakob Glesnes was added as a replacement for Alexander Callens on August 4.

Coach:  Adrian Heath (Minnesota United FC)

Liga MX All-Stars

The Liga MX All-Stars roster was announced on July 19, 2022. Juan Escobar, Guido Pizarro, Luis Quiñones and Víctor Guzmán were called up as replacements for Dória, Diego Barbosa, Jordan Carrillo and Ángel Mena.

Coach:  Diego Cocca (Atlas)

Broadcasting

The All-Star Game was broadcast in the United States on ESPN in English and Univision in Spanish. ESPN's coverage included play-by-play commentary by Jon Champion and analysis by Taylor Twellman, as well as studio coverage by Sebastian Salazar and Herculez Gomez—including pre-game, halftime, and post-game shows. The All-Star Skills Challenge was broadcast the day before on ESPN2. In Canada, TSN carried the match in English and TVA Sports in French. ESPN's international affiliates also broadcast the All-Star Game in Mexico, Latin America, and other countries. In the United Kingdom, the match was broadcast live on Sky Sports.

Skills Challenge

The MLS All-Stars defeated Liga MX in the Skills Challenge, winning 3–2 across five events. The 2022 All-Star Game marked the return of "Goalie Wars", a head-to-head competition between goalkeepers, which was not televised and involved four MLS Next Pro players.

Match rules

Unlimited substitutions
Players limited to a total of 45 minutes
Penalty shoot-out if tied at full time; no extra time

Match

References

2022
All-Star Game
August 2022 sports events in the United States
2022 in sports in Minnesota
2022–23 Liga MX season
2022–23 in Mexican football